Caoimhín Odhrán Kelleher (born 23 November 1998) is an Irish professional footballer who plays as a goalkeeper for  club Liverpool and the Republic of Ireland national team.

Early life
Kelleher was born in Cork, County Cork, where he attended Presentation Brothers College.

Club career
Kelleher joined Liverpool's academy from Ringmahon Rangers in summer 2015. He featured regularly for Liverpool's side during their pre-season programme of 2018 and was part of the squad that travelled to the United States for Liverpool's summer tour.

In August 2018, he signed a new contract with Liverpool. He was an unused substitute for the 2019 UEFA Champions League Final against Tottenham Hotspur. In winning the Champions League, he became the 12th Irish footballer to do so and the first for over a decade.

Though he was recovering from wrist surgery, Kelleher was on the bench for Liverpool's victory in the 2019 UEFA Super Cup against Chelsea in Istanbul due to the absence of first-choice Alisson. He made his competitive debut for the club on 25 September 2019 in an EFL Cup Third Round match, keeping a clean sheet against League one side Milton Keynes Dons, in a 2–0 away win.

On 1 December 2020, he started and kept a clean sheet in a 1–0 victory against Ajax in the Champions League. Five days later, Kelleher was named in the starting line-up for a Premier League match against Wolverhampton Wanderers. He kept a clean sheet in the match, a 4–0 win, which was his third consecutive shutout for the club. At 22 years and 13 days, Kelleher became the third-youngest Liverpool goalkeeper to keep a Premier League clean sheet and the youngest to do so on his first league start. After several strong performances, manager Jürgen Klopp confirmed that Kelleher had been promoted to second choice, behind Alisson and ahead of Adrián. It was also reported that Liverpool were seeking to sign Kelleher to a new long-term contract on improved terms.

On 24 June 2021, Kelleher signed a new long-term deal with the club until 2026, saying "For me, it was a positive moment to commit my future to the club for the next few years. It’s such a big club and it’s an honour to be a part of it, so when I got the chance to sign for a few more years I was obviously delighted." James Pearce, who covers Liverpool F.C. for The Athletic said that it was "Reward for his impressive progress last season," and that he was now Alisson's Number 2.
 
On 27 February 2022, Kelleher started in the 2022 EFL Cup Final and scored the decisive penalty in the 11–10 penalty shoot-out win against Chelsea.

On 9 November 2022, Kelleher made his first start of the 2022–23 season and saved three penalties in a 3–2 penalty shoot-out win against Derby County in the third round of the 2022–23 EFL Cup at Anfield. He has now saved a total of six penalties in four shootouts for Liverpool which is a club record. Four of his eight appearances in the EFL Cup have gone to penalties with Liverpool winning all of them.

International career
Kelleher featured for the Republic of Ireland U17s in the 2015 UEFA European Under-17 Championship.

He was capped by his country at under-17 level in 2014, making his debut against Malta. He has also been capped at under-19 and under-21 level.

On 6 November 2018, he was named in the senior Republic of Ireland squad for the first time for the friendly match against Northern Ireland on 15 November and the UEFA Nations League match against Denmark on 19 November 2018.

He was called up again by the senior national team in March 2019, whilst still part of the under-21s.

On 8 June 2021, Kelleher made his senior Ireland debut, coming on as a half-time substitute against Hungary in a 0–0 draw. He was then included in the lineup for a friendly against Qatar in October 2021.

Personal life
Kelleher is the younger brother of fellow footballer, Fiacre Kelleher. He has three other older brothers who played hurling.

Career statistics

Club

International

Honours
Liverpool
FA Cup: 2021–22
EFL Cup: 2021–22
UEFA Champions League: 2018–19, runner-up: 2021–22
UEFA Super Cup: 2019

References

External links

Profile at the Liverpool F.C. website

1998 births
Living people
Association footballers from Cork (city)
Republic of Ireland association footballers
Association football goalkeepers
Liverpool F.C. players
Premier League players
UEFA Champions League winning players
Republic of Ireland youth international footballers
Republic of Ireland under-21 international footballers
Republic of Ireland international footballers
Republic of Ireland expatriate association footballers
Expatriate footballers in England
Irish expatriate sportspeople in England